PIFS may refer to:

Pacific Islands Forum
Public information film
PCF Interframe Space
 partitioned iterated function system, used in fractal compression